Startkey is a USB flash storage device developed by Microsoft and SanDisk.

History 
StartKey began in May 2007 when Microsoft and SanDisk made an agreement to provide unspecified software to replace U3 that was included on SanDisk flash devices.

Features 
StartKey will turn USB-based flash drives into a “Windows companion” that will allow users to carry their Windows and Windows Live settings with them. It will work with other formats, including SD memory cards.

See also 
 Windows To Go
 Portable application
 Portable application creators
 Comparison of application launchers

References

External links 
 Microsoft StartKey – Windows on a USB
 Microsoft Research - Keychain

USB
Computer storage devices
SanDisk products